Collin Ambrose Assenga  commonly known as Senior,  is a Tanzanian.He lives and works in Tanzania

Biography
Kendell Geers was born in Leondale, a working-class suburb on the East Rand outside Johannesburg, South Africa, into an Afrikaans family during the time of apartheid. 

At the age of 15, Geers ran away from home due to an abusive, alcoholic father, and joined the anti-apartheid movement. The apartheid government had a policy of compulsory conscription for white males as young as 16 years old. Geers applied to the University of the Witwatersrand in Johannesburg in order to avoid conscription into the South African Defense Force.

While at art school, Geers met fellow artist Neil Goedhals and they formed the Performance Art group KOOS with Marcel van Heerden, Gys de Villiers, Megan Kruskal and Velile Nxazonke. KOOS sang post-punk / industrial music ballads, based on Afrikaans protest poetry by poets like Ryk Hattingh and Christopher can Wyk. Although they were included on the Voëlvry compilation album and performed at Die Eerste Afrikaanse Rockfees, KOOS performed only one concert, at the University of the Witwatersrand, as part of The Voëlvry Movement tour. KOOS disbanded in 1990 following the suicide of Neil Goedhals on 16 August 1990.

At Wits University Geers became an activist working with National Union of South African Students and the End Conscription Campaign. In 1988, he was one of 143 young men who publicly refused to serve in the South African Defense Force and faced a six-year prison sentence as a direct consequence. He left South Africa and went into exile as a refugee in the United Kingdom. From there, he moved to New York City, where he worked as an assistant to artist Richard Prince in 1989.

In 1990, Geers returned to South Africa as soon as Nelson Mandela and other political prisoners were released from prison. He began working as an art critic and curator whilst practicing as an artist. The first work of art he created back on South African soil was called "Bloody Hell", a ritual washing of his white Afrikaaner Boer body with his own fresh blood. The essay begins with the words "I am guilty! I cannot hide my guilt, as it is written all over my face. I was born guilty, without being given the option" an acknowledgment that one of the artist's ancestors (Carel Frederik Christoffel Geers) was a Boer at the Battle of Blood River. The blood that he washed himself with symbolized an exorcism of his ancestral, cultural and religious heritage. 

Challenging his Afrikaans family and Boer culture, he changed his date of birth to May 1968 as a political act, reclaiming his identity by destroying the person he was born as (named Jacobus Hermanus Pieter), in order to give birth to himself as the artist Kendell Geers. The act of washing his skin in his own blood was a reference to the line "My head is bloody, but unbowed" from the poem Invictus. Whilst incarcerated on Robben Island prison, Nelson Mandela recited this poem to other prisoners. Geers chose May 1968 in recognition of the world’s last great utopian revolution and numerous anti-apartheid protests at the Venice Biennial, which resulted in a boycott that lasted until 1993. The date also refers to the Situationist International movement, and the concept of Détournement in which "Ultimately, any sign or word is susceptible to being converted into something else, even into its opposite"

Shortly after his return from exile, Albie Sachs wrote a seminal essay called “Preparing Ourselves for Freedom” in which he calling on his fellow ANC members to desist from "saying that culture is a weapon of struggle." In response Geers wrote an article for the Star Newspaper in which Geers reversed the challenge by "saying that the struggle is a weapon of culture." He wrote "All good art is political in the sense that it challenges the ideologies and cultural prejudices of both the viewer and the artist. Political art must be perceived less as a set of predictable subjects and more as a critique of social representations" Believing that there can be "No Poetry after Apartheid" Geers used the alienation he felt in relation to his cultural heritage to create a new practice that he called "Relational Ethics" in which he used his experiences as an activist as a weapon to challenge the minimalist aesthetics of Conceptual art. In this period he began using police batons, razormesh, broken glass, gunshots, danger tape and punk style xeroxes in his art. In 1995 he created "Self Portrait," an iconic work that consists of no more than a broken Heineken beer bottleneck. The label remains attached to the broken glass and reads "Imported from Holland. The Superior Quality."

In 1999 Geers took up a one year residence at Solitude Palace in Stuttgart and from there moved to Leipzig, Berlin, Vienna and finally settled in London. Following a deep sense of disillusionment in the art system he decided to take a 12 month sabbatical in which he did not create a single work of art. His plan was to instead read and think about art, life, politics in search of a justification to continue making art. He was however already committed to a solo exhibition curated by Nicolas Bourriaud and Jérôme Sans so he promised that he would exhibit the conclusion of his year long research driven sabbatical at the Palais de Tokyo. The resulting exhibition was called "Sympathy for the Devil" and consisted of a single matchstick titled "The Terrorists Apprentice" installed in the empty museum. During the opening on the 1 June 2002, a vandal destroyed the matchstick, but it was replaced the following day

Geers moved to Brussels in 2003

Methodology
Curator Clive Kellner described the 1988 - 2000 period of Geers work as political but the artist does not like this label. Instead of declaring what he believes in he prefers to create art that embodies a moral ambiguity that invites the viewer to confront what they believe in and this way there is a dialogue and a transformation. He refers to this as TerroRealism which he defines as "artists who had grown up in countries that had been torn apart by war, revolution, conflict, crime and genocide created work according to an entirely different set of aesthetic principles. In place of the cool detached passive showroom aesthetics of the white cube shrine, their work was invested with a Reality Principle that sought to disrupt the viewer’s pleasure more than satisfy it."

Geers is known best for using a variety of images, objects, colours and materials that signal danger in an attempt to examine power structures, social injustices, and establishment values. Geers also uses words as a means to explore the power relations and coding of language the borders of semantics in communicating complex contradictory emotions and states of being. Geers creates disarmingly simple situations, like a single matchstick in an empty museum or a broken bottle of beer, but the simple reading quickly disintegrates within a complex forest of signs. He often compares his work to the scene of a crime in which the viewer must reconstruct what has happened and then try to find their own connection to that understanding.  "The working process is defined by risk and experiment and yes sometimes I have glorious failures but sometimes what remains is something like the scene of a crime, both attractive and repulsive and the viewer is the detective that must put all the pieces together and decode my intentions."

Most of Geers' artwork showcases in visceral, raw emotion where words fail. He tries to "create pieces in which viewers have to accept responsibility for their presence in the work of art. They are always free to walk away or move on, but if they decide to engage with work then the process becomes an active one". Geers' works create a physical presence and about performing a specific effect rather than depicting it.

Geers centres his work around the limits of experience like ecstasy, fear, desire, love, beauty, sexuality, violence and death because he believes that these extreme experiences are beyond our ability to express in words. The knowledge, fear and theories of that experience are central to most cultures around the world. He is drawn to the taboos that govern our lives because they are beyond our abilities to control, no matter who we presume ourselves to be, rich, poor, illiterate, educated.

Lost Object
Lost object is an Art Historical term coined by artist Geers to set apart his practice of using existing objects, images or materials. The term is a protest against the term Found Object popularised by Marcel Duchamp. The play on words contrasting Lost with Found is a semantic strategy often used by the artist.

According to Columbia University Professor Z.S. Strother “He rightfully rejects the use of the term Found Object since it grants megalomaniac power to the last person in a chain of hands contributing to a work's biography: 'I prefer the concept of the LOST OBJECT because it suggests that there is a history and a context to the object, image or thing BEFORE it is reduced to a work of art.”

In his 1996 essay “The Perversity of my Birth, the Birth of my Perversity” the artist wrote that “Modernism was built upon precisely the same essentialist Christian philosophies and beliefs as Colonialism” and that “In rejecting Colonialism and its protégé Apartheid, I thus have no option but to also reject every element of its ideological and hegemonic machinery including its morality, art and the culture” and so therefore the concept of Found Object is rejected as flawed in a moral association with Colonialism.

Geers compares the Modernist concept of the Found Object with the Colonial act of “DISCOVERING” a country, or a continent, that effectively erases centuries of history by disregarding the indigenous people who live there. By the very same logic Duchamp’s act of finding erases the history, ownership, provenance, use, value and context of an object, whereas the designation “Lost Object” implies all former histories and context in the spirit of Guy Debord's concept of Détournement

The Lost Object releases the work of art from the Artist’s ego with an open source participation in the history of the design manufacture, use, ownership and function of the object through symbolic Upcycling. Geers argues that the Found Object cannot exist outside of the quarantine of a White Cube Gallery so Duchamp literally transformed the gallery into an aesthetic zone comparable to hospitals and toilets in which every form of reality is purged like the contaminant of a virus.”

Body of work

Early work

His early work was influenced by the ideas expressed in his response to Albie Sachs and the idea that "The Struggle is a Weapon of Art." Strongly influenced by the ideas of Léopold Sédar Senghor Geers used his experiences as an anti-apartheid activist to interrogate the reading of Conceptual art from an Afro-Centric perspective. Writing about African Conceptualism for the ground breaking exhibition "Global conceptualism: points of origin, 1950s-1980s" at Queens Museum, Okwui Enwezor wrote "In African art, two things are constantly in operation: the work and the idea of the work. These are not autonomous systems. One needs the other and vice versa. A paraphrase of an Igbo idea will clarify this relationship: where there is something standing which can be seen, there is something else standing next to it which cannot be seen but which accompanies the object. In its material basis, African art is object-bound, but in its meaning and intention it is paradoxically anti-object and anti perceptual, bound by the many ways of conveying ideas whereby speech or oral communication are highly valued"

Geers’ art is an activity located not inside the solitude of the studio but in the rough and tumble world of actions, of political, social, and cultural engagement in what he called a dialogue between art and life. His early work was marked with political violence and the violence of politics. His weaponised art by charging conceptual aesthetics with the ethics of political structures of control that explored the moral and ethical contradictions of the apartheid. He developed a visual vocabulary characterized by provocation using a refined black humour that upcycled charged materials like concrete, security fencing, danger tape, broken glass shards, police batons, handcuffs, profanity, pornography into works of art. By appropriating historical events and ideas, he focused on questions of relationship between individual and society. It was in this context that Geers joined every political party in the period before South Africa’s first democratic elections, from the extreme right-wing to the Communist party. In this way, he expressed his doubts about the fetishization of party politics.

He invented the system of calling his work "Title Withheld" in order to politically shift the convention of calling art "Untitled." "Title Withheld (Refuse)" was a 1993 sculpture that consisted of black refuse bags in which the political verb to refuse was transformed into the aesthetic garbage (refuse). The 1995 work "Title Withheld (Boycott)" was a room in the Johannesburg Art Gallery designed by Colonial architect Sir Edwin Lutyens that had been emptied of its apartheid collection and the bare room exhibited in the spirit of "The Void" by Yves Klein. "With this attack on the institution (and by extension, some of his fellow artists), Geers asserted that art could refuse and resist the ideology of museological practice. Thus, the seemingly empty room questioned the pervasive modernist hunger for market-oriented postcolonial objects. As an amplification of this debate, Title Withheld (Boycott) returns us to the vault of the museum, to its ethnographic storage rooms and holding docks, where art and cultural objects await dispersal into the myriad networks of institutional recontextualization. It is precisely what has been cleared and evacuated from the gallery’s walls that is the subject of this intensely aware intervention."

He was one of 27 artists that represented South Africa at the 1993 Venice Biennale curated by Achille Bonito Oliva, the first time since the 1968 anti-Apartheid boycotts that South African artists had been invited. Whilst in Venice, he rose to Infamy as the first artist to urinate into Marcel Duchamp's Fountain (Duchamp).

Self Portrait 

"Self Portrait" is an iconic work created in 1995 that consists of no more than a broken Heineken beer bottleneck. The label remains attached to the broken glass and reads "Imported from Holland. The Superior Quality." Geers believes that every object is more than the sum of its physical parts and is instead the embodiment of an ideology, and a portrait both of its maker and its consumer. The broken bottle of Dutch beer represents the values, and morality of the Boers, convinced that apartheid was a legitimate political system. In rejecting his own ancestors and their totalitarian ideologies, Geers symbolically breaks open the beer bottle in order to set himself free.  Like his ancestors the Boers, Heineken beer was imported into South Africa. The work was exhibited in New York on an exhibition called "Simunye' ('We Are One')" in 1996 and happened to be in the cargo hold of TWA Flight 800 that exploded as it was taking off on 17 July 1996 so Geers transformed the unique original into an edition of 12, comparing himself to two six packs of beer. Geers describes the work "Many people think that I chose Heineken because I actually like beer and more than that, drink Heineken and I have to correct them. Identity is very complex, especially if you are a White African and self-loathing is part of your cultural inheritance. In 1990, when Mandela was released and Apartheid de-legislated, our identity as South Africans was up for grabs. Our history, culture, morality, faith, values and everything that one might normally take for granted, as “identity” was in my case illegitimate. As an African I consider myself an animist and respect my ancestors, but those ancestors are Dutch. The broken bottle of beer speaks of identity as violence, the self as broken, the spirit the bottle once contained has been drunk and all that remains is the garbage of history" Holland Cotter's The New York Times review said "Every now and then, political art delivers the kind of epiphany it's supposed to: the one-liner idea that sends out unexpected ripples. Such is the case with a piece by the South African artist Kendell Geers in this stimulating show. He simply places an art-book caption for Marcel Duchamp's Conceptual joke "Air of Paris" beside a news photo of police administering oxygen to a victim of a terrorist attack. In the face of this simple reality check, Duchamp's academic gamesmanship collapses into irrelevancy."

Later work

Following his year long sabbatical in 2001/2002 his work increasingly took on a spiritual dimension influenced by Alchemy, Kabbalah, Esoterism, Animism, Tarot and Tantra, whilst maintaining his commitment to Activism. He would later define this evolution as "AniMystikAktivist". The shift has been misinterpreted by some as a more poetic phase. Here, Geers transferred his incendiary practice into a post-colonial and increasingly global context, suggesting more universal themes like terrorism, spirituality, and mortality. As such, the artist’s life and work can be said to constitute a living archive composed of political events, photographs, letters, and literary texts that serve as a source of inspiration and represent a continuation of his oeuvre.

Selected work in public collections
 "Brick" 1988, Johannesburg Art Gallery, Johannesburg, South Africa
"Hanging Piece" 1993, Zeitz Museum of Contemporary African Art, Cape Town, South Africa
 "T. W. Batons (Circle)" 1994, MAXXI Museum, Rome, Italy
 "T.W. (I.N.R.I.)" 1994, Centre Pompidou, Paris, France
 "Tears for Eros" 1999, Chicago Art Institute, Chicago, USA
 "T.W. (Scream)" 1999, SMAK, Ghent, Belgium
 "NOITULOVER" 2003, Castello di Ama, Chianti, Italy
 "Akropolis Redux (The Directors Cut)" 2004, EMST Athens, Greece
 "Monument to the Unknown Anarchist" 2007, BPS22 Collection, Charleroi, Belgium
 "Mutus Liber 953" 2014, MUKHA Antwerp, Belgium

Curatorial projects 
Geers curated his first group exhibition in 1990 whilst working as a journalist for the Vrye Weekblad newspaper. The project was conceived as a newspaper exhibition in which artists were invited to create a work of art specifically for the double page centre fold of the weekly newspaper. The exhibition was published on 14 December 1990

In 1992 Geers curated "A.I.D.S. The Exhibition" at the Johannesburg ICA inviting 17 artists all under the age of 30 to respond to the AIDS pandemic. Artists included C.J. Morkel, Wayne Barker, Belinda Blignaut, Joachim Schönfeldt, Mallory de Cock, Julie Wajs, Diana Victor

Between 1993 and 1999 Geers worked as the curator and art consult for Gencor which was later bought out by BHP Billiton. The collection focused on artists and works of art that were central to the Anti-Apartheid Movement spirit dating from historical artists like Gladys Mgudlandlu, Gerard Sekoto, Walter Battiss, Robert Hodgins, Ezrom Legae and Durant Sihlali to contemporaries like Sam Nhlengethwa, William Kentridge and Penny Siopis. In his introduction essay to the book "Contemporary South African Art: The Gencor Collection" Geers explains "The core of the collection (installed in the lift lobbies) consists of a group of ten works that have been curated thematically to embody the spirit of the time between Nelson Mandela’s release from prison on 11 February 1990 and his eventual election as president on 27 April 1994. This period is unique and will in all likelihood never be matched in South African history again. It was a moment during which the old Nationalist government acknowledged that after 46 years of illegitimate rule, their presence in power would soon be over, together with everything they had stood for. At the same time the African National Congress (ANC) refused to accept responsibility for the country until they had been democratically elected to do so. Finding itself between opposing governments, together with the destabilising efforts of covert governmental organisations, the country fell apart socially, politically, economically and culturally. The legitimacy of the old laws was challenged and contested without new laws having yet been written to replace them. The period was characterised by widespread violence, the proliferation of pornography, prostitution, drugs, gangs, confessions, denials, accusations, murders, abductions and assassinations. Yet at the same time the air was filled with the spirit of renewal, euphoria and optimistic hope concerning the prospect of the first democratic election" The book included essays by Okwui Enwezor, Olu Oguibe, Colin Richards, Elza Miles, Ashraf Jamal and others.

In 1995 Geers resigned from the curatorial committee of the first Johannesburg Biennale in order to make an application to curate his own exhibition. His choice of title "Volatile Colonies" was an amalgamation of the two main themes "Volatile Alliances" and "Decolonising our Minds" The exhibition positioned itself in opposition to the curatorial concept of Magiciens de la terre on which the Biennial was based. The artists which included Janine Antoni, Hany Armanious, Carlos Capelán, Ilya and Emilia Kabakov, Philippe Parreno, Paul Ramirez Jonas and Rirkrit Tiravanija were selected "by their experiences and relationships with the languages of art rather than by their ethnicity. Although able to survive in the centre, they are always aware of their own intrinsic differences in relation to that position. No longer content to be tolerated as victims, they are seizing control of their lives and art by setting trends rather than following. Their ethnic origins and experiences are transformed from an initial disadvantage into a weapon against the languages of art."

Social sculptures

Strongly influenced by the Social sculpture concept of Joseph Beuys and the African art principle of "African Art as Philosophy" based on the ideas of Leopold Senghor Geers conception of art evolved with the logic of an expanded field. He believes that Art is he result of Life and Life is the source of Art. "It’s very important for me that life comes before art, that living and exposing myself to things is a process that happens in my life and in my
world. This process is absolutely necessary, because I don’t believe that I can make art if I have not experienced those things."

On the 25 April 2003 he launched RED SNIPER, a performance art music collaboration with Front 242 musician Patrick Codenys. The project was an attempt to find a hybrid space between image and music, working from video clips that were looped, remixed and composed simultaneously from both visual and audio points of view. The sound was composed at the same time the image was edited, creating an audio-visual mix as much about music as it was about video.

In 2009 whilst preparing the work "Stripped Bare" for his exhibition "A Guest Plus a Host = A Ghost" Geers was struck by the violent beauty of the lead bullets as they opened up like flowers when they hit the glass. He cast one of the exploded bullets into 18kt yellow gold earrings for Elisabetta Cipriani Wearable Art and called the Social Sculpture "Within Earshot"

In 2020 Geers designed the A.S. Velasca kits for the season 2020/21.

Manifesto 

In the preparations for a retrospective that would begin at the South African National Gallery and travel to Haus der Kunst Geers fell out with the curators. He fell into "a deep depression at the time brought about by the injustices of an art system that cares only about market ranking and price tags. The art system has no use or value for vision, integrity or consequence.". For a second time in his life, he found himself unable to create, so instead of making art he decided to use his time in search of a reason to justify being an artist. He began a list of reasons that eventually evolved into a manifesto. In trying to come to terms with the illegitimacy of his identity as a working-class Afrikaans white man, Geers authored the Political-Erotical-Mystical Manifesto, bringing together his early political activism with a spiritual consciousness.

Exhibitions
Kendell Geers has participated in many international exhibitions and biennials including the Johannesburg Biennale (1995, 1997), Havana Biennale (1994), Istanbul Biennale (2003), Taipei Biennale (2000) Lyon Biennale (2005) Venice Biennale (1993, 2007, 2011, 2017, 2019) Dakar Biennial (2018) Shanghai Biennale (2016) Sao Paolo Biennial (2010) Carnegie International (1999) and Documenta (2002 and 2017). His first retrospective exhibition was called “Irrespektiv” and toured in 2007 from BPS22 (Charleroi Belgium) to SMAK (Gent Belgium), BALTIC Centre for Contemporary Art (Newcastle), Musée d'art contemporain de Lyon (Lyon France), DA2 Domus Artium (Salamanca, Spain) and MART (Trento, Italy). The second retrospective was organised by Okwui Enwezor in 2013 at the Haus der Kunst (Munich Germany)

Bibliography
"Argot" Chalkham Hill Press, 1993. .
"Contemporary South African Art," Jonathan Ball Publishers, 1997. .
"My Tongue in Your Cheek," Dijon: les Presses du réel; Paris: Réunion des musées nationaux, 2002. .
"The Plague is Me," Artist Book, One Star Press, France 2003, Limited Edition of 250 copies
Kendell Geers. Mondadori Electa, 2004. .
"Kendell Geers; The Forest of Suicides." published by MACRO, Museo D'Arte Contemporanea, Roma, 2004. .
"Point Blank," Artist Book, Imschoot Uitgevers, Belgium, 2004 limited edition of 1000 copies 
 "Fingered" Imschoot Uitgevers, 2006. .
"Irrespektiv." BOM / Actar, 2007. .
"Be Contemporary #07" Edited by Kendell Geers, Be Contemporary Publishers, France, 
"Kendell Geers 1988–2012." Edited by Clive Kellner, Prestel, 2012. 
"Hand Grenades From My Heart". Edited by Jerome Sans, Blue Kingfisher, Hong Kong, 2012. 
"Aluta Continua," Edited by Kendell Geers, ArtAfrica Magazine March 2017
"AniMystikAKtivist: Between Traditional and the Contemporary in African Art" Essays by Jens Hoffmann and Z.S. Strother, Mercatorfonds and Yale University Press, 2018, 
"IncarNations: African Art as Philosophy," Edited by Kendell Geers, Silvana Editoriale Italy, 2019, 
"OrnAmenTum'EtKriMen" Danillo Eccher, M77 Gallery, Milano, 2020

References

External links
 IMODARA

Living people
Censorship in the arts

Belgian performance artists
South African performance artists
Conceptual artists
Contemporary painters

Postmodern artists
Institutional Critique artists

South African contemporary artists
1968 births
Art controversies